Sir Walter Badock, KBE, CSI (8 March 1854 – 28 April 1931) was a British civil servant. He served as Accountant-General at the India Office from 1907 to 1919.

References 

 

1854 births
1931 deaths
Knights Commander of the Order of the British Empire
Companions of the Order of the Star of India
Civil servants in the India Office
Place of birth missing